In the Peruvian city of Trujillo, a Guaripola is a young woman who leads a band of musicians in a parade. She often juggles and gives a show of dancing and acrobatic maneuvering using a bar or stick, called a guaripola.

History
The first Trujillo Spring Festival was held in 1950. Some of the most appreciated participants in the festival each year are the "Guaripolas". The Guaripolas animate the principal parade and give artistic presentations in several locations in the city.

Description
The Guaripola is generally a young girl who leads every band of musicians in the principal parade for the Spring Festival. She dresses in a one-piece swimsuit and uses a bar of metal during her performance. The festival presents approximately 10 Guaripolas, with each one giving an independent show (dancing and acrobatic maneuvering with a bar or stick called guaripola) with a band. The parade lasts about 3 hours.

See also
Trujillo Spring Festival
Trujillo Marinera Festival
Majorette

References

External links

Map of Trujillo, place of Spring festival

Media
 
  in Trujillo city (Peru).

Trujillo, Peru
Festivals in Trujillo, Peru